James Cathcart may refer to:

 James Carter Cathcart, American voice actor
 J. F. Cathcart (James Faucett Cathcart, 1827–1902), English actor in Australia
 James Leander Cathcart (1767–1843), diplomat, slave, and sailor